Nkosinathi Phiwayinkosi Thamsanqa Nhleko, popularly known as Nathi Nhleko, is a former South African Minister of Police. Nhleko served in parliament as Chairperson of the Portfolio Committee on Public Service and Administration, chairperson of the African National Congress (ANC) caucus. As well as ANC chief whip, and Member of the Judicial Service Commission.

References

Year of birth missing (living people)
Living people
African National Congress politicians
Government ministers of South Africa
Women government ministers of South Africa